The following species in the flowering plant genus Dianthus are accepted by Plants of the World Online. The genus has undergone the fastest radiation known in any plant taxon. 

Dianthus acantholimonoides 
Dianthus acicularis 
Dianthus acrochlorus 
Dianthus aculeatus 
Dianthus afghanicus 
Dianthus agrostolepis 
Dianthus akdaghensis 
Dianthus albens 
Dianthus algetanus 
Dianthus alpinus 
Dianthus altaicus 
Dianthus anatolicus 
Dianthus ancyrensis 
Dianthus andronakii 
Dianthus androsaceus 
Dianthus angolensis 
Dianthus angrenicus 
Dianthus angulatus 
Dianthus anticarius 
Dianthus arenarius 
Dianthus argentii 
Dianthus armeria 
Dianthus arpadianus 
Dianthus arrostii 
Dianthus × artignanii 
Dianthus aticii 
Dianthus atlanticus 
Dianthus atschurensis 
Dianthus austroiranicus 
Dianthus awaricus 
Dianthus aydogdui 
Dianthus aytachii 
Dianthus balansae 
Dianthus balbisii 
Dianthus barbatus 
Dianthus basianicus 
Dianthus basuticus 
Dianthus benearnensis 
Dianthus bessarabicus 
Dianthus bicolor 
Dianthus biflorus 
Dianthus bolusii 
Dianthus borbasii 
Dianthus borbonicus 
Dianthus brachycalyx 
Dianthus brevicaulis 
Dianthus brevipetalus 
Dianthus broteri 
Dianthus brutius 
Dianthus burchellii 
Dianthus burdurensis 
Dianthus busambrae 
Dianthus cachemiricus 
Dianthus caespitosus 
Dianthus callizonus 
Dianthus campestris 
Dianthus candicus 
Dianthus canescens 
Dianthus capitatus 
Dianthus carbonatus 
Dianthus carmelitarum 
Dianthus carthusianorum 
Dianthus caryophyllus 
Dianthus caucaseus 
Dianthus charidemi 
Dianthus chimanimaniensis 
Dianthus chinensis 
Dianthus chouardii 
Dianthus cibrarius 
Dianthus ciliatus 
Dianthus × cincinnatus 
Dianthus cinnamomeus 
Dianthus cintranus 
Dianthus collinus 
Dianthus corymbosus 
Dianthus costae 
Dianthus × courtoisii 
Dianthus crenatus 
Dianthus cretaceus 
Dianthus cribrarius 
Dianthus crinitus 
Dianthus crossopetalus 
Dianthus cruentus 
Dianthus cyathophorus 
Dianthus cyprius 
Dianthus cyri 
Dianthus daghestanicus 
Dianthus darvazicus 
Dianthus deltoides 
Dianthus demirkushii 
Dianthus denaicus 
Dianthus deserti 
Dianthus desideratus 
Dianthus diffusus 
Dianthus × digeneus 
Dianthus dilepis 
Dianthus diversifolius 
Dianthus dobrogensis 
Dianthus × dufftii 
Dianthus dumanii 
Dianthus edetanus 
Dianthus elatus 
Dianthus elbrusensis 
Dianthus eldivenus 
Dianthus elegans 
Dianthus elymaiticus 
Dianthus engleri 
Dianthus eretmopetalus 
Dianthus ernesti-mayeri 
Dianthus erythrocoleus 
Dianthus eugeniae 
Dianthus excelsus 
Dianthus falconeri 
Dianthus × fallens 
Dianthus ferrugineus 
Dianthus floribundus 
Dianthus formanekii 
Dianthus fragrans 
Dianthus freynii 
Dianthus fruticosus 
Dianthus furcatus 
Dianthus gabrielianae 
Dianthus gasparrinii 
Dianthus genargenteus 
Dianthus giganteiformis 
Dianthus giganteus 
Dianthus glacialis 
Dianthus glutinosus 
Dianthus goekayi 
Dianthus goerkii 
Dianthus gracilis 
Dianthus graminifolius 
Dianthus graniticus 
Dianthus gratianopolitanus 
Dianthus grossheimii 
Dianthus guessfeldtianus 
Dianthus guliae 
Dianthus guttatus 
Dianthus gyspergerae 
Dianthus haematocalyx 
Dianthus hafezii 
Dianthus halisdemirii 
Dianthus hamzaoglui 
Dianthus harrissii 
Dianthus helenae 
Dianthus × hellwigii 
Dianthus × helveticorum 
Dianthus henteri 
Dianthus holopetalus 
Dianthus humilis 
Dianthus hymenolepis 
Dianthus hypanicus 
Dianthus hyrcanicus 
Dianthus hyssopifolius 
Dianthus ichnusae 
Dianthus imereticus 
Dianthus inamoenus 
Dianthus ingoldbyi 
Dianthus insularis 
Dianthus integer 
Dianthus integerrimus 
Dianthus jacobsii 
Dianthus jacquemontii 
Dianthus × jaczonis 
Dianthus japigicus 
Dianthus japonicus 
Dianthus jaroslavii 
Dianthus × javorkae 
Dianthus juniperinus 
Dianthus juzeptchukii 
Dianthus kapinaensis 
Dianthus karami 
Dianthus karataviensis 
Dianthus kastembeluensis 
Dianthus khamiesbergensis 
Dianthus kirghizicus 
Dianthus kiusianus 
Dianthus klokovii 
Dianthus knappii 
Dianthus koreanus 
Dianthus kremeri 
Dianthus kubanensis 
Dianthus kuschakewiczii 
Dianthus kusnezowii 
Dianthus lactiflorus 
Dianthus laingsburgensis 
Dianthus lanceolatus 
Dianthus langeanus 
Dianthus laricifolius 
Dianthus legionensis 
Dianthus leptoloma 
Dianthus leptopetalus 
Dianthus leucophaeus 
Dianthus leucophoeniceus 
Dianthus libanotis 
Dianthus lindbergii 
Dianthus longicalyx 
Dianthus longicaulis 
Dianthus longiglumis 
Dianthus longivaginatus 
Dianthus × lorberi 
Dianthus × lucae 
Dianthus lusitanus 
Dianthus lydus 
Dianthus macranthoides 
Dianthus macranthus 
Dianthus macroflorus 
Dianthus mainensis 
Dianthus marschallii 
Dianthus martuniensis 
Dianthus masmenaeus 
Dianthus mazanderanicus 
Dianthus × melandrioides 
Dianthus membranaceus 
Dianthus mercurii 
Dianthus micranthus 
Dianthus microlepis 
Dianthus micropetalus 
Dianthus moesiacus 
Dianthus monadelphus 
Dianthus monspessulanus 
Dianthus morisianus 
Dianthus mossanus 
Dianthus moviensis 
Dianthus multiceps 
Dianthus multiflorus 
Dianthus multisquamatus 
Dianthus multisquameus 
Dianthus muschianus 
Dianthus myrtinervius 
Dianthus namaensis 
Dianthus nangarharicus 
Dianthus nanshanicus 
Dianthus nardiformis 
Dianthus nihatii 
Dianthus nitidus 
Dianthus nodosus 
Dianthus nudiflorus 
Dianthus oliastrae 
Dianthus orientalis 
Dianthus oschtenicus 
Dianthus × ossetianus 
Dianthus paghmanicus 
Dianthus palinensis 
Dianthus pallens 
Dianthus pamiralaicus 
Dianthus pancicii 
Dianthus patentisquameus 
Dianthus pavlovii 
Dianthus pavonius 
Dianthus pelviformis 
Dianthus pendulus 
Dianthus persicus 
Dianthus petraeus 
Dianthus pinifolius 
Dianthus plumarius 
Dianthus plumbeus 
Dianthus polylepis 
Dianthus polymorphus 
Dianthus praecox 
Dianthus pratensis 
Dianthus pseudarmeria 
Dianthus pseudocrinitus 
Dianthus pungens 
Dianthus purpureimaculatus 
Dianthus pygmaeus 
Dianthus pyrenaicus 
Dianthus raddeanus 
Dianthus ramosissimus 
Dianthus recognitus 
Dianthus recticaulis 
Dianthus repens 
Dianthus rigidus 
Dianthus robustus 
Dianthus roseoluteus 
Dianthus rudbaricus 
Dianthus rupicola 
Dianthus ruprechtii 
Dianthus sachalinensis 
Dianthus saetabensis 
Dianthus sahandicus 
Dianthus sancarii 
Dianthus sardous 
Dianthus × saxatilis 
Dianthus scaber 
Dianthus scardicus 
Dianthus schemachensis 
Dianthus seguieri 
Dianthus seidlitzii 
Dianthus semenovii 
Dianthus seravschanicus 
Dianthus serotinus 
Dianthus serpentinus 
Dianthus serratifolius 
Dianthus serrulatus 
Dianthus sessiliflorus 
Dianthus setisquameus 
Dianthus shinanensis 
Dianthus siculus 
Dianthus simulans 
Dianthus sinaicus 
Dianthus siphonocalyx 
Dianthus somanus 
Dianthus sphacioticus 
Dianthus spiculifolius 
Dianthus squarrosus 
Dianthus stamatiadae 
Dianthus stapfii 
Dianthus stellaris 
Dianthus stenocephalus 
Dianthus stenopetalus 
Dianthus stepanovae 
Dianthus sternbergii 
Dianthus stramineus 
Dianthus stribrnyi 
Dianthus strictus 
Dianthus strymonis 
Dianthus subacaulis 
Dianthus subaphyllus 
Dianthus × subfissus 
Dianthus subscabridus 
Dianthus subulosus 
Dianthus superbus 
Dianthus sylvestris 
Dianthus szowitisianus 
Dianthus takhtajanii 
Dianthus talyschensis 
Dianthus tarentinus 
Dianthus tenuiflorus 
Dianthus thunbergii 
Dianthus tlaratensis 
Dianthus toletanus 
Dianthus transcaucasicus 
Dianthus transvaalensis 
Dianthus trifasciculatus 
Dianthus tripunctatus 
Dianthus tymphresteus 
Dianthus ucarii 
Dianthus ugamicus 
Dianthus uniflorus 
Dianthus uralensis 
Dianthus urumoffii 
Dianthus uzbekistanicus 
Dianthus vanensis 
Dianthus varankii 
Dianthus vigoi 
Dianthus virgatus 
Dianthus viridescens 
Dianthus viscidus 
Dianthus vladimirii 
Dianthus volgicus 
Dianthus vulturius 
Dianthus × warionii 
Dianthus webbianus 
Dianthus woroschilovii 
Dianthus xylorrhizus 
Dianthus zangezuricus 
Dianthus zederbaueri 
Dianthus zeyheri 
Dianthus zonatus

References

Dianthus